Grand Waterfront is a private housing estate and a shopping mall in Ma Tau Kok, Kowloon, Hong Kong, near Kowloon City Ferry Pier. Formerly a Hong Kong and China Gas towngas plant, the estate consists of five 57-storey high-rise buildings and a shopping arcade. It was jointly developed by Henderson Land Development and Hong Kong and China Towngas and completed in 2007.

History
The site was formerly the southern plant of the Ma Tau Kok towngas factory, owned by Hong Kong and China Gas. It was shut down in the 1990s. Height restrictions across Kowloon were relaxed following the 1998 closure of nearby Kai Tak Airport. Henderson Land, which owns part of the Hong Kong and China Gas Company, applied to the Town Planning Board to allow for high-rise residential development on the site.

The complex was designed by DLN Architects of Hong Kong. The main contractor was Heng Shung Construction, a subsidiary of Henderson Land.

As part of the launch of the project, in August 2006, Jennifer Hawkins became the ambassador for the development. Full front page colour photographs of her appeared as advertisements in several Chinese-language newspapers; minute-long advertisements for the development were aired on primetime television in Hong Kong featuring Hawkins.

Characteristics and features
It has five residential blocks housing 1,782 units, a shopping centre, and a 268-space car park.

The residential blocks have 52 storeys (51 with residential flats, plus the lobby level). As some floor numbers are omitted for superstitious reasons, the topmost floors are labelled as the 62nd storey.

It has approximately 50 shops. The largest anchors are Wellcome Superstore and Victoria Harbour Restaurant.

Transport
The estate is adjacent to Kowloon City Ferry Pier and the Kowloon City Ferry Pier Bus Terminus.

Education
Grand Waterfront is in Primary One Admission (POA) School Net 34. Within the school net are multiple aided schools (operated independently but funded with government money) and two government schools: Farm Road Government Primary School and Ma Tau Chung Government Primary School.

References

External links 

 Official website of Grand Waterfront
 

Private housing estates in Hong Kong
Residential skyscrapers in Hong Kong
Henderson Land Development
Buildings and structures completed in 2007
Ma Tau Kok
Shopping centres in Hong Kong